The Hadjemi people are found in that part of Iran between Isfahan and Teheran. The term includes the Talysh and Mazandarani peoples of the shores of the Caspian Sea.

Notes

References
 

Ethnic groups in the Middle East